St Mary Abbots is a church located on Kensington High Street and the corner of Kensington Church Street in London W8.

The present church structure was built in 1872 to the designs of Sir George Gilbert Scott, who combined neo-Gothic and early-English styles. This edifice remains noted for having the tallest spire in London and is the latest in a series on the site since the beginning of the 12th century.

The church, and its railings, are listed at Grade II* on the National Heritage List for England.

History

Foundation
Sir Aubrey de Vere was a Norman knight who was rewarded with the manor of Kensington, among other estates, after the successful Norman Conquest. Around 1100, his eldest son, Godfrey (great-uncle of Aubrey, 1st Earl of Oxford), was taken seriously ill and cared for by Faritius, abbot of the Benedictine Abbey of St Mary at Abingdon. After a period of remission, Godfrey de Vere died in 1106 aged about 19.

The de Vere family's gratitude to the abbey for their son's care was recognised by its bequest of land . In 1262 the abbey founded a church and parish in Kensington, dedicated to St Mary. The epithet of Abbots is deemed to derive from its link with the ancient Abingdon Abbey rather than that subsequently with the diocese of the Bishop of London. However, this led to a dispute with the bishop and legal action followed in the diocesan consistory court. This resulted in the patronage of the church passing to the bishop in perpetuity but rights over the surrounding land remaining with the abbey. The succession of vicars is recorded in a direct line back to this foundation in 1262.

Rebuilds

In 1370 the Norman church was rebuilt. 

When William III relocated the Royal Court to Kensington Palace in 1689 the area became fashionable rendering the medieval church too small, thus it was demolished at the end of the 17th century and replaced by a Late Renaissance-style building. This in turn proved too small as London urbanised in the 19th century.

Around 1860 the vicar, Archdeacon William Sinclair, launched a campaign for the building of a striking new church. The architect George Gilbert Scott was engaged and recommended the demolition of the existing church to take advantage of the site at the road junction. St Mary Abbot's design is almost certainly influenced by Scott's earlier work on Dunblane Cathedral - its west front's tall window and carved tympanum are similar to those in the Cathedral. The present church retains many fittings from the earlier churches, especially funeral monuments from the mid-17th century onwards.

In June 2015, the church launched a major fundraising appeal, looking to raise around £7.2m, to be spent on restoring the church and improving it as a community hub.

Bells
The tower holds a ring of ten bells hung for change ringing.  Five of these bells — the fourth, fifth, sixth, eighth and ninth of the current ring — date from 1772 and were cast by Thomas Janaway.  The other five — the treble, second, third, seventh and tenor — were cast in 1879 by John Warner & Sons.
The five bells were funded through a donation by Phyllis Cunliffe (1890–1974), mother to Christopher Ironside (UK decimal coin designer).

Primary school
The church has an associated primary school in its churchyard, founded in 1707 as a charity school.  The school buildings were designed by Nicholas Hawksmoor in 1711, but demolished in the 1870s to make way for a town hall.  The present buildings date from 1875 and are notable for the painted stone statues by Thomas Eustace of a boy and girl, dating from about 1715, now on the north face of the school; its playgrounds intersperse with the churchyard, and the school maintains close links with the Church of England.

Notable people

Notable clergy
 Canon Donald Allchin, theologian, served his curacy here from 1956 to 1960

Notable parishioners
 Joseph Addison
 David Cameron
 George Canning
 Tennessee Claflin (married Sir Francis Cook, 1st Baronet at the church in 1885)
 Alec Clifton-Taylor
 Edmund Fanning
 Michael Gove
 Adrian Hardy Haworth
 P. D. James
 John Lockwood Kipling and Alice Kipling (parents of Rudyard Kipling, married at the church in 1865)
 Thomas Babington Macaulay
 Sir Isaac Newton (commemorated by a window in the north transept)
 Beatrix Potter
 William Thackeray
 William Wilberforce
 Diana, Princess of Wales (in 1997 the church became a focus for mourners)

Gallery

References

External links

 
 www.london.anglican.org

1262 establishments in England
19th-century Church of England church buildings
Benedictine monasteries in England
Church of England church buildings in the Royal Borough of Kensington and Chelsea
Churches completed in 1872
Diocese of London
George Gilbert Scott buildings
Grade II* listed buildings in the Royal Borough of Kensington and Chelsea
Grade II* listed churches in London
History of the Royal Borough of Kensington and Chelsea
Kensington
Rebuilt churches in the United Kingdom
Religious organizations established in the 1100s